The N6 is a Bangladeshi national highway connecting Rajshahi and Kashinathpur in the Bangladeshi Division of Rajshahi.

Junction list

The entire route is in Rajshahi Division.

References

National Highways in Bangladesh